Stephen Allen Womack (born February 18, 1957) is an American politician serving as the U.S. representative for  since 2011. The district, which was once represented by future Senator J. William Fulbright, covers much of northwestern Arkansas, including Fort Smith, Fayetteville, Springdale, and Womack's hometown of Rogers. A member of the Republican Party, Womack was mayor of Rogers before his election to Congress.

Womack chaired the House Budget Committee from 2018 to 2019, and was its ranking member from 2019 to 2021.

Early life, education, military service, and business career 

Womack was born in Russellville, Arkansas, the son of Elisabeth F. (Canerday) and James Kermit Womack. Womack's father founded KURM-AM in 1979, a radio station serving the Fayetteville, Arkansas area. He spent most of his childhood in Moberly, Missouri, but moved back to Russellville at age 16 and graduated from Russellville High School in 1975. He graduated with a B.A. in communications from Arkansas Tech University in 1979. Shortly afterward, he enlisted in the Arkansas Army National Guard. He served for 30 years, retiring in 2009 as a colonel. He simultaneously served as station manager for KURM (AM) from 1979 to 1990.

Womack served in a variety of command and staff positions with the Arkansas Army National Guard, including platoon leader, troop commander, battalion commander, and regimental commander.

After the September 11 attacks, Womack's unit, the 2nd Battalion, 153rd Infantry Regiment of Arkansas 39th Infantry Brigade, was called to active duty for service with the Multinational Force and Observers in Sinai, Egypt. His task force was trained at Fort Carson, Colorado, and deployed overseas in January 2002. On 13 January 2002, TF 2-153 became the first pure National Guard unit to receive the mission as the United States Battalion (US BATT) in the MFO. It also marked the first time in the 35-year history of the 39th Brigade that a battalion was mobilized for overseas duty.

His military decorations include:

 Legion of Merit
 Meritorious Service Medal with oak leaf cluster
 Army Commendation Medal
 Army Achievement Medal
 Global War on Terror Expeditionary and Service Medals

On October 31, 2009, Womack retired with over 30 years of service from the Arkansas Army National Guard at the rank of colonel. Before his retirement, he commanded the 233rd Regiment, Arkansas Regional Training Institute.

From 1990 to 1996, Womack served as an executive officer for the United States Army Reserve Officers' Training Corps. From 1996 to 1998, he worked as a financial consultant for Merrill Lynch & Co.

Mayor of Rogers 
In 1998, Womack was elected mayor of Rogers, holding the post for 12 years. During his mayoralty, Womack sought to crack down on illegal immigration by assigning two Immigration and Naturalization Service agents to the Rogers Police Department. As a result, the Mexican American Legal Defense and Educational Fund filed a class-action suit against the city's police force, accusing it of racial profiling.

Womack was reelected unopposed in 2002 and 2006, holding the office until he ran for Congress in 2010

U.S. House of Representatives

Elections

2010

In late 2009, Womack jumped into the race for the 3rd District after incumbent Representative John Boozman announced that he would run for the United States Senate. The 3rd is one of the most Republican districts in the South and the nation (Republicans have held it since 1967), and it was generally believed that whoever won the Republican primary would be the district's next representative. Womack ranked first in the seven-candidate primary with 31% of the vote. In the June runoff, he defeated State Senator and fellow Rogers resident Cecile Bledsoe, 52%-48%.

In the general election, Womack defeated Democratic nominee David Whitaker, 72%-28%.

2012

Womack was originally set to face veteran Ken Aden in his reelection bid, but Aden withdrew from the race on July 8, after admitting to exaggerating his military record. As it was too late to select a replacement candidate for Aden (under Arkansas law, the Democratic Party could only name a replacement at that date if the original candidate died, moved out of the district or opted to seek another office), Womack faced no major-party opposition in November. He was reelected with 76% of the vote, defeating Rebekah Kennedy (Green Party of the United States, 16%) and David Pangrac (Libertarian Party (United States), 8%).

2014

Thomas Brewer, a math teacher and minister, originally announced he was challenging Womack for the Republican nomination, and Troy Gittings, a high school English teacher and stand-up comedian, had announced he was running for the Democratic nomination. But neither Brewer nor Gittings ended up filing, leaving Libertarian Grant Brand as Womack's only challenger. He was reelected with 79% of the vote to Brand's 21%.

2016

Womack again faced no Democratic candidate in the general election. He defeated Libertarian Steve Isaacson 77%-23%.

2018

Womack faced a Republican primary challenge from Robb Ryerse, a self-described "progressive Republican." He defeated Ryerse, 84%-16%.

In the general election, Womack faced Democratic opposition for the first time as an incumbent. Womack defeated Josh Mahoney, president of the Arkansas Single Parent Scholarship Fund and former chairman of the Fayetteville Airport Commission, and Libertarian Michael Kalagias, on election day, 65%-33%-2%, his smallest margin of victory to date.

2020

Womack did not face a challenge in the Republican primary, and he defeated the Democratic nominee, nurse practitioner Celeste Williams, and Kalagias, 64%-32%-4%.

Tenure

In 2010, Womack signed a pledge sponsored by Americans for Prosperity promising to vote against any global warming legislation that would raise taxes.

Womack was a member of the House Appropriations Committee when in 2014 lawmakers inserted a prohibition into an appropriations bill that would prevent USDA staff from working on finishing regulations related to the meat industry.

In a 2015 episode of his show Last Week Tonight with John Oliver, John Oliver criticized Womack for blocking the enforcement of laws proposed by the Grain Inspection, Packers and Stockyards Administration that were designed to protect chicken farmers from being threatened or punished by the companies they work for if they spoke out regarding their farming experiences.

In 2015, Womack condemned the Supreme Court ruling in Obergefell v. Hodges, which held that same-sex marriage bans violated the constitution.

In December 2017, Womack voted for the Tax Cuts and Jobs Act of 2017.

On May 19, 2021, Womack was one of 35 Republicans to join all 217 Democrats present in voting to approve legislation to establish the January 6 commission meant to investigate the storming of the U.S. Capitol.

On November 30, Womack voted in favor of H.R. 550: Immunization Infrastructure Modernization Act of 2021. The bill helps create confidential, population-based databases that maintain a record of vaccine administrations.

As of October 2021, Womack had voted in line with Joe Biden's stated position 15% of the time.

In 2022, Womack was one of 39 Republicans to vote for the Merger Filing Fee Modernization Act of 2022, an antitrust package that would crack down on corporations for anti-competitive behavior.

Committee assignments
Committee on Appropriations
Subcommittee on Financial Services and General Government (Ranking Member)
Subcommittee on Transportation, Housing and Urban Development, and Related Agencies
United States House Appropriations Subcommittee on Defense

Caucus memberships
United States Congressional International Conservation Caucus
Republican Study Committee
Republican Governance Group
House Republican Conference
House Republican Steering Committee
House Republican Policy Committee

Political positions

Abortion

When Roe v. Wade was overturned, Womack declared "life wins", saying, "This decision rightfully restores the American people's ability to protect babies and recognizes the science-backed truths of the humanity of the unborn."

Personal life
Womack attends Cross Church Pinnacle Hills, a Southern Baptist church in Rogers, Arkansas. He and his wife, Terri, have been married for 37 years. They have three sons and three grandsons.

Electoral history

References

External links

Congressman Steve Womack official U.S. House website
Steve Womack for Congress 

|-

|-

|-

|-

1957 births
21st-century American politicians
Arkansas Tech University alumni
Baptists from Arkansas
Baptists from the United States
Living people
Mayors of places in Arkansas
Merrill (company) people
Military personnel from Arkansas
National Guard (United States) colonels
People from Moberly, Missouri
People from Randolph County, Missouri
People from Russellville, Arkansas
People from Pope County, Arkansas
Protestants from Arkansas
Recipients of the Legion of Merit
Southern Baptists
Republican Party members of the United States House of Representatives from Arkansas